Henrietta Mbawah ( – 17 February 2023) was a Sierra Leonean actress, filmmaker and social activist. She was best known as the director of critically acclaimed short film Jattu and role of 'Journalist' in short film Ebola Checkpoint.

Life and career
Initially, Mbawah started to act in television serials with minor and uncredited roles. In 2016, she made the short film Jattu. The film rotates around a girl called Jattu, who survived Ebola outbreak in Africa. Later in the same year, she appeared in the short film Ebola Checkpoint where she played the role 'Journalist'. She was also the Chief Executive Officer Manor River Entertainment Company. In 2019, she won Sister's Choice Award due to her involvement for the women empowerment in Sierra Leone.

Mbawah died on 17 February 2023, at the age of 34.

Partial filmography

References

External links
 
 Interview with Henrietta Mbawah

1980s births
Year of birth uncertain
2023 deaths
Sierra Leonean actresses
Sierra Leonean film directors